Ashley House may refer to:

 Ashley House (Paget Parish, Bermuda), a 17th-century cottage in Bermuda
 Dr. George Ashley House, a historic house in Paris, Idaho
 Ashley House (Fall River, Massachusetts), an historic house in Fall River, Massachusetts
 Colonel John Ashley House in Sheffield, Massachusetts
 Ashley House (Charleston, South Carolina), high rise in Charleston, South Carolina
 Ashley House (TV presenter), British television presenter